Alyson Patricia "Aly" Ackman (born 6 February 1993) is a professional swimmer competing on the Canadian National Swim Team since 2013. In 2016, she retired from her professional swimming career to pursue a career as a personal trainer and swimming coach. Prior to her retirement, she won a silver medal in the 4 x 200 Freestyle relay and a bronze in the 4 x 100 Freestyle relay at the 2014 Commonwealth Games in Glasgow.

At the 2014 FINA Pan Pacific Championships Ackman came 12th in the 200m freestyle, 14th in the 100m freestyle, 18th in the 400m freestyle, 4th in the 4×100 freestyle, and won bronze in the 4 × 200 m freestyle relay.

In 2015 Ackman competed at the Pan American Games and the FINA World Championship (Kazan, Russia). During the Pan American Games, she earned a gold medal in the 4 X 100 Freestyle and in the 4 X 200 Freestyle events.

Coming out of retirement in January 2019, Ackman competed in several international meets, including the 2018 Canadian Swimming Trials and Swimming Nationals, as well as the 2019 Canadian Swimming Trials where she qualified for the 2019 Pan American Games in Lima, Peru.

Ackman captained the Penn State Varsity Team her senior year before graduating with a Bachelor's of Science in Kinesiology. She now lives in Philadelphia, Pennsylvania, with her husband, Luke Synnestvedt.

See also
 List of Commonwealth Games medallists in swimming (women)

References

External links
 
 
 
 
 
 Alyson Patricia Ackman at the Lima 2019 Pan American Games

1993 births
Living people
Anglophone Quebec people
Swimmers at the 2014 Commonwealth Games
Commonwealth Games silver medallists for Canada
Commonwealth Games bronze medallists for Canada
Canadian female freestyle swimmers
Swimmers from Montreal
Swimmers at the 2015 Pan American Games
Swimmers at the 2019 Pan American Games
Pan American Games gold medalists for Canada
Pan American Games bronze medalists for Canada
Commonwealth Games medallists in swimming
Pan American Games medalists in swimming
Medalists at the 2015 Pan American Games
Medalists at the 2019 Pan American Games
Medallists at the 2014 Commonwealth Games